Girls' Generation-Oh!GG is the second sub-unit of South Korean girl group Girls' Generation, formed by SM Entertainment in 2018. Composed of the five Girls' Generation members who remained with the agency: Taeyeon, Sunny, Hyoyeon, Yuri, and Yoona, Oh!GG officially debuted in September 2018 with the single "Lil' Touch".

History
On October 9, 2017, Girls' Generation members Seohyun, Tiffany and Sooyoung decided to leave SM Entertainment, effectively putting the group on hiatus. The label later announced the group was not disbanded, and future involvement with the three members and Girls' Generation would be discussed.

On August 2, 2018, SM Entertainment revealed that Girls' Generation would be forming a new unit group, and that more details would be revealed soon. On August 27, SM Entertainment unveiled Girls' Generation-Oh!GG as the group's second unit, consisting of the members still signed to the label. The group made its debut on September 5 with the single "Lil' Touch", which was released in both digital and physical formats. The single contained the title track "Lil' Touch", and a B-side entitled "Fermata" as well their instrumentals. "Lil' Touch" was initially one of the two choices for member Yuri's debut single, with the second being "Into You" but the company gave "Lil' Touch" to the group since it was faster and they believed it suited a group more.

On December 9, 2021, it was revealed that Oh!GG would be participating in SM Town's upcoming winter album titled 2021 Winter SM Town: SMCU Express and online concert in 2022. On December 21, it was announced the group would be releasing "Melody" as part of the winter album.

Discography

Single albums

Singles

Other charted songs

Videography

Music videos

Filmography

Television shows

Concerts

Concert participation

SMTOWN Live: "SMCU Express @ Kwangya" (2022)

Awards and nominations

Notes

References

External links
  

 
K-pop music groups
Musical groups established in 2018
SM Entertainment artists
South Korean dance music groups
South Korean girl groups
SM Town
2018 establishments in South Korea
Musical groups from Seoul